English Harbour is a natural harbour and settlement on the island of Antigua in the Caribbean, in the extreme south of the island. The settlement takes its name from the nearby harbour in which the Royal Navy established its base of operations for the area during the eighteenth century. Its population is 759 (2001 Census).

English Harbour is a centre of boating, especially yachting. There are two sheltered deepwater harbours nearby; English Harbour itself and Falmouth Harbour.

Naval history

English Harbour is best known for Nelson's Dockyard, a former British Navy base; it displays restored 18th and 19th-century buildings and other historical artefacts from the colonial period of the dockyard, especially the time it was commanded by Horatio Nelson.

The Royal Navy had begun using English Harbour as a safe haven in the 17th century. In 1704 Fort Berkeley was built on a spit across the harbour entrance to defend it.

The Antigua Legislature assigned English Harbour to the King for naval use in 1725, and included adjoining land in 1729.  By 1745, the harbour was fortified. Captain Horatio Nelson arrived in July 1784 as the senior officer of the Northern Division of the West Indies Station, commanding HMS Boreas, until his departure in 1787. Nelson referred to the harbour as an "infernal hole," while the "residents of these Islands are Americans by connexion and by interest, and are inimical to Great Britain. They are as great rebels as ever were in America, had they the power to show it." Nelson was joined in Dec. 1786 by Captain His Royal Highness Prince Wiliam Henry, commanding HMS Pegasus.

HM Naval Yard, Antigua, began on the eastern side of the harbour (on the site presently occupied by the Antigua Slipways boatyard) in the 1730s. The Yard was expanded across the bay on the western side (on the site known today as Nelson's Dockyard) in the 1740s. Both sites remained in use over the following decades. Each at first consisted of careening wharves and storehouses; to these, other buildings were added over time. By the end of the Napoleonic Wars a substantial complex of facilities had been developed at English Harbour: in addition to the twin Dockyards, the Harbour accommodated a Victualling Yard, an Ordnance Yard (where the Gunpowder House Hotel now stands) and a Royal Naval Hospital. The Commissioner (the senior Navy Board official at the Dockyard) resided at Clarence House on a hillside overlooking the bay.

Governor Shirley drew up plans in 1782 to fortify the high ground to the east.  Construction of Shirley Heights began in 1788 and proceeded until 1793.  Fort Shirley was garrisoned by the 86th Regiment in the 1830s, replaced by 180 soldiers of the 36th Foot in 1833.  The garrison was abandoned in 1854, making the harbour defenceless.

Subsequent History
The Royal Mail Steam Packet Company used the harbour as a port of call from 1840 onwards.

After 1815 the dockyard decreased in importance. By the 1850s the eastern yard was being used as a coal store and the western yard was described as being in poor repair. Nevertheless the yards remained open, finally closing in 1889. Sixty years later, the first moves were made toward preserving what became known as Nelson's Dockyard. Today it flourishes as a yachting centre as well as a historic monument, and is described as 'the only working Georgian dockyard in the world'. Much of the surrounding area is a National Park.

After the land was returned to the Antigua government in 1906, the harbour facilities fell into ruin.  Governor Kenneth Blackburne is credited with launching the restoration program in 1951, which raised 40,000 British Pounds.  This restoration drive was a consequence of a 1948 study by the Ministry of Works stating that the more important building were worth restoring, enabling the naval dockyard to become an attraction for island visitors in 1961.

In 2018, politicians urged local squatters to take advantage of plans to allow them to buy their plots of land for $1 if they had lived there for ten years or more.

Demographics 
English Harbour has three enumeration districts.

 71800 EnglishHarb-Town
 71900 EnglishHarb-OrdnanceBay 
 72000 EnglishHarb-MiddleGround

Census Data (2011)

References

English Harbour
Bays of Antigua and Barbuda
Saint Paul Parish, Antigua and Barbuda
Populated places in Antigua and Barbuda